Salar de Antofalla is a salt flat in the Andes of Catamarca Province in the Argentine Northwest. The salt flat contains systems of oncoids that grow in the interface between proper salt flat and an adjacent wetlands. The geology surrounding the southern part of Salar de Antofalla is made up of continental (e.i. non-marine) sedimentary rock that deposited from Late Eocene to Early Pleistocene times.

References

Antofalla
Antofalla
Landforms of Catamarca Province
Puna de Atacama